Michael Woods (dates unknown) was an English organist.

Career
Woods' musical career was centred at Chichester Cathedral where he served as Organist for four years, between 1565 and 1569. When he was succeeded by Clement Woodcock, he was admitted as a lay clerk. A number of manuscripts kept at the British Library and Royal College of Music are ascribed to 'Woods'.

See also
Organs and organists of Chichester Cathedral

References

Year of birth unknown
Year of death unknown
Cathedral organists
English classical organists
British male organists
Male classical organists